Prawaas (Marathi: प्रवास) is a 2020 Marathi-language drama film directed by Shashank Udapurkar, produced under banner of Om Chhangani Films. The film stars Ashok Saraf, Padmini Kolhapure, Shashank Udapurkar, Vikram Gokhale and Rajit Kapur.

The first scene was filmed on 15 October 2018, and the principal photography began on 19 October in Mumbai. Filming ended on 16 April 2019 and it was released on 14 February 2020.

Cast 

 Ashok Saraf - Abhijat Inamdar
 Padmini Kolhapure - Lata Inamdar
 Shashank Udapurkar - Dilip Inamdar
 Vikram Gokhale - Dr. Nene
 Rajit Kapur - Pandit Ramakant Joshi
 Shreyas Talpade - Shreyas Talpade
 Supriya Karnik - Lata's friend
 Ankush Ubhad - young Abhijat Inamdar

Plot 
Prawas is the journey of an elderly couple, Abhijat Inamdar (Ashok Saraf)) and Lata Inamdar (Padmini Kolhapure). Every person has a certain time to live in this world and it is important to understand how one lives one's life. Abhijat also knows that he has a certain time to live his life and nobody is immortal. He realises that there are so many people who need help and he starts helping them in their problems which gives him confidence in himself, a great sense of satisfaction and unique identity. Abhijat teaches us a very important lesson that there are two most important days in our life, one the day we are born and the next when we find why? when you help others and live your life meaningfully you will be the happiest person on the Earth. In the journey of life, we forget to live our lives and become negative. But the moment we realize the correct way to live our life we start enjoying it. The film beautifully conveys to people that whatever is left in their life is something very special.

Release
The film was released on 14 February 2020. It was screened at 51st International Film Festival of India in January 2021 and will also be screened at 52nd International Film Festival of India in 'Indian Panorama' section, feature film category.

Soundtrack 

The music was composed by Salim–Sulaiman with lyrics written by Guru Thakur. The songs are sung by Sonu Nigam, Hariharan, Sukhwinder Singh and Shreya Ghoshal.

Amar Mohile composed the background music. The first song in the film, "Prawaas (Reprise)",sung by Shreya, was released on 14 January 2020. The second song, "Prawaas Title Song", sung by Sonu Nigam, was released on 20 January 2020. The music album was released on 9 January 2020 by Zee Music Company Music.

References

External links 
 

Indian drama films
2020s Marathi-language films
2020 drama films